"Fallen Angel" is the third single from the album Neon released by Erasure on October 28, 2020.

Video 
A video was dropped in the same day, which was directed and produced Brad Hammer. It features Heidi N Closet, who appeared on season 12 of RuPaul's Drag Race, and model Alexa Abraxas. The video was described as "a spooky video just in time for Halloween".

Remixes 
On December 4, 2020, new remixes were released headlined by Georgia. A special six-track limited-edition 12” orange-vinyl EP (including high definition download code) was released which also featured remixes of other tracks from the album. The remixes are done by Nimmo, Bright Light Bright Light, Initial Talk, Daybreakers and Vince Clarke. There was also a ‘Fallen Angel’ CD singles as part of the 3-CD 'The Neon Singles' boxset.

The CD 3 of 'The Neon Singles' boxset, features these remixes:

 "Fallen Angel" - Georgia Remix
 "Fallen Angel" - Georgia Dub**
 "Fallen Angel" - Georgia Remix Instrumental**
 "Fallen Angel" - Confidence Man Remix
 "Fallen Angel" - Confidence Man Dub**
 "Fallen Angel" - Confidence Man Remix Instrumental**
 "Fallen Angel" - Ben Rainey Remix
 "Fallen Angel" - Ben Rainey Dub**
 "Fallen Angel" - Ben Rainey Remix Instrumental**
 "Shot A Satellite" - Initial Talk Remix Instrumental** 
** - previously unreleased

On July 16, 2021 Erasure released Fallen Angel (Saint Remix) from their forthcoming ‘The Neon Remixed’ LP. Other remixes include works by Kim Ann Foxman, Hifi Sean, Octo Octa, Paul Humphreys (OMD), Andy Bell & Gareth Jones, and Theo Kottis.

Reviews 
 PopMatters called it "is...  reassuring, rhythmically as well as lyrically, with Bell gently urging us on to a warm bed of Clark’s haunting synth work" and "another patented Erasure tune: emo lyrics, Bell’s plaintive warbling, Clarke’s inventive and luxuriant production."
 Metro Weekly said "It features a gorgeous chorus and some of the most memorable synth work on the entire album, but is ultimately dragged down by excess padding and lyrics that come off as trite."
 SLUG Magazine gave it positive review.
 Retro Pop described it as a favorite on the album.
 Affinity Magazine gave it a positive review, stating ' “Fallen Angel” is about facing your fears and trying “all of the things that give [you] love.” It’s an anthem track, a song that can (and should) be used to inspire listeners.Bell’s vocals and Clarke’s keyboard work play together very well on this track. There’s something playful about The Neon’s 3rd track, a vintage sound that hearkens back to an 8-bit video game soundtrack. The interaction of vocals and instrumentals works wonders for “Fallen Angel,” conveying the message of the need to try and do the things that give you love.'

References

External links 
 "Fallen Angel" video on YouTube
 "Fallen Angel" (Georgia Remix) on YouTube

Erasure songs
2020 singles